Bryan Anderson (born March 30, 1980 in Philadelphia, Pennsylvania) is a former  American football offensive guard in the National Football League. He was a seventh round selection (261st overall pick) by the Chicago Bears in the 2003 NFL Draft.

Anderson played college football for the Pittsburgh Panthers. He played high school football at John Bartram High School in Philadelphia. He is best known for being the second-to-last pick in the 2003 NFL Draft.

References

1980 births
Living people
American football offensive guards
Players of American football from Philadelphia
Pittsburgh Panthers football players
Chicago Bears players